Armida Siguion-Reyna (born Armida Liwanag Ponce Enrile; November 4, 1930February 11, 2019) was a Filipina singer, film and stage actress, producer and television show host. She was the chairperson of the Movie and Television Review and Classification Board during the Estrada administration from 1998 to 2001.

Early life and education
Armida Siguion-Reyna was born as Armida Liwanag Ponce Enrile on November 4, 1930 in Malabon, the daughter of Alfonso Ponce Enrile, her Spanish mestizo father who was a lawyer and regional politician, and Purita Liwanag, her mother who was one of the early graduates of the University of the Philippines College of Music. Siguion-Reyna spent her childhood with her parents and siblings in their house in Malabon. She studied at the Far Eastern University and Philippine Women's University, which are both in Manila. She also studied at the United States for her high school and college education. She completed high school at Academy of St. Joseph in New York, although, she did not finish her college studies at the Georgian Court University in New Jersey after being broken-hearted.

She (aged 18) and her sister, artist Irma Potenciano, met their half-brother Juan Ponce Enrile.

Career

Theatrical roles
In the world of operas, Siguion-Reyna performed lead singing roles in Lucia de Lammersville, Rigoletto, La Traviata, I Pagliacci, The Merry Widow, and the zarzuela Ang Mestiza (The Mestiza).

Television
Siguion-Reyna was the presenter for the television programmes "Cooking Atbp." ("Cooking etc.") and the award-winning "Áawitan Kita" ("I Will Sing for You"). "Áawitan Kita" aired for over 30 years and was one of longest-running musical television shows in the Philippines.

Music
Siguion-Reyna recorded musical albums such as the two volumes of "Aawitan Kita" (Villar Records), "Armida" (Dyna Music), and "Sa Lungkot at Saya... Aawitan Kita" ("In Sadness and Happiness... I Will Sing For You," Viva Records).

Film
In 1975, Siguion-Reyna was awarded best supporting actress during the Bacolod Film Festival for her performance in the film "Sa Pagitan ng Dalawang Langit" ("In Between Two Heavens"). Later on she would be well known for collaborations with big names actresses such as Alma Moreno and a kontrabida (villain) to actresses Vilma Santos and Nora Aunor in several films. She is well known for also co-producing films with her son and having Maricel Soriano and Rosanna Roces in films and Dawn Zulueta these actresses have been in two films of Siguion-Reyna.

Producer
As a producer, Siguion-Reyna produced and starred in her own 16-mm film musicals entitled "Dung-aw," "Lakambini," "Supremo" (on the life on Andrés Bonifacio), "Pagpatak ng Ulan" ("When The Rain Falls"), and "Sisa."  She had two film production companies. Her Pera Films company produced the movies "Laruang Apoy" ("Playing Fire") and "Bilanggong Birhen" ("Jailed Virgin"). She managed Reyna Films Company with her son Carlitos, who was a two-time award recipient.

As a public servant
During the Presidency of Joseph Estrada, Siguion-Reyna was appointed as the chairperson of the Movie and Television Review and Classification Board (MTRCB) in 1998. She was known to be an advocate of freedom of speech and artistic liberties in film. Even before she became the chairperson of MTRCB, she fought against censorship and together with peers like Lino Brocka, Behn Cervantes and Ishmael Bernal, they had protested the actions of Siguion-Reyna's predecessors, specifically Manuel Morato and Henrietta Mendez.

When she was MTRCB's chair, her board members consisted of anti-censorship people. They were lenient in rating films to be shown publicly in theaters. Though, she was criticized for being biased on film produced by her own production outfit and by her friends. She countered her critics and said that the board did not grant permits to films showing purely sexual content and thus, the films were given X-rating, which means that those films were not suitable to be shown in cinemas.

Her term ended in 2001 after Estrada was ousted through the Second EDSA Revolution.

Death
Siguion-Reyna died of cancer in Makati at the age of 88, on February 11, 2019.

Filmography

Television

Movies

Notes

References

1930 births
2019 deaths
Actresses from Metro Manila
Deaths from cancer in the Philippines
20th-century Filipino women singers
Filipino musical theatre actresses
Filipino people of Spanish descent
Filipino television actresses
Filipino television presenters
People from Malabon
Star Music artists
Chairpersons of the Movie and Television Review and Classification Board
Estrada administration personnel
Philippine Women's University alumni
Filipino women film producers
20th-century Filipino actresses
Filipino women television presenters